Voyeykov Ice Shelf, is an ice shelf fringing the coast between Paulding Bay and Cape Goodenough, Antarctica. Mapped by the Soviet Antarctic Expedition (SovAE) (1958) and named after Aleksandr I. Voyeykov (1842–1916), a Russian climatologist.

See also

 Ice shelves of Antarctica

References

Ice shelves of Antarctica
Bodies of ice of Wilkes Land